Festuca calligera, also known as the callused fescue, is a species of grass in the family Poaceae.

References

calligera